Qeshlaq-e Qarah Darreh-ye Kahel va Qeshlaq-e Hajji Shahverdi (also Romanized as Qeshlāq-e Qarah Darreh-ye Kahel va Qeshlāq-e Ḩājjī Shāhverdī) is a village in Qeshlaq-e Sharqi Rural District, Qeshlaq Dasht District, Bileh Savar County, Ardabil Province, Iran. At the 2006 census, its population was 113, in 29 families.

References 

Populated places in Bileh Savar County
Towns and villages in Bileh Savar County